Conrado Rodríguez López (born 1884) was a Cuban pitcher in the Negro leagues and the Cuban League in the 1900s and 1910s.

A native of Cuba, Rodríguez played in the Negro leagues in 1909 for the Cuban Stars (West). He also spent several seasons in the Cuban League between 1907 and 1916 with Club Fé, Almendares, and Habana.

References

External links
 and Seamheads

1884 births
Date of birth missing
Year of death missing
Place of birth missing
Place of death missing
Almendares (baseball) players
Club Fé players
Cuban Stars (West) players
Habana players
Cuban expatriate baseball players in the United States